The 2010–11 Hockey East women's ice hockey season marked the continuation of the annual tradition of competitive ice hockey among Hockey East members.

Offseason
 June 2, 2010: 2010 Canadian Olympic gold medallists Catherine Ward and Marie-Philip Poulin have tentatively agreed to join the Terriers.
 August 16, 2010: Four Terriers players were named to Canada's Under 22 team. Jenelle Kohanchuk, Tara Watchorn, Jennifer Wakefield and Marie-Philip Poulin will take part in an exhibition series against the United States Under 22 team from August 18–21 in Toronto.
 September 20: Hockey East commissioner Joe Bertagna released the 2010 WHEA preseason coaches poll. The Boston University Terriers are the preseason favourites to win the league championship.
 September 28: In the USA Today/USA Hockey Magazine Women's College Hockey Poll, the Terriers have been voted as the pre-season Number 4.

Exhibition

CIS Exhibition

Season standings

Regular season

News and notes
 October 2: Olympic gold medallist Marie-Philip Poulin scored a goal for Boston University in her first NCAA game.
 October 3: By defeating North Dakota by a 6-2 mark, it signified the first time in program history that the Terriers defeated an opponent from the WCHA.
 Marie-Philip Poulin led all NCAA freshmen in goals (9) and points per game (2.00) during October 2010. In addition, she led all Hockey East freshmen in goals, assists and points, and ranked during the month. She was ranked first among all Hockey East players in shorthanded goals with three. In the first seven games of her NCAA career, she had a seven-game point-scoring streak consisting of nine goals and seven assists.
 Kelli Stack finished October 2010 with fifteen points (nine goals, six assists) in eight games for Boston College. Stack started every game at center and has accumulated points in every game. She finished the month leading the Eagles in points, goals, power play goals, and shorthanded goals. On October 31, she was involved in all three goals against Connecticut (one goal, two assists). She was part of all three goals scored at Vermont on October 15 (two goals, one assist). Against the Syracuse Orange (on October 9), Stack scored a hat trick.
 The 1-0 shutout by Connecticut on November 13 ended New Hampshire’s 17-game unbeaten streak against the Huskies. The Huskies penalty kill was a perfect 6-of-6 on the weekend. The shutout on November 13 marked the first time the Wildcats were shut out at home since Nov. 28, 2004 (by Mercyhurst), a streak of 109 consecutive home games.
 November 21: Northeastern player Katie McSorley recorded her first career hat trick and added two assists as the Huskies prevailed by a 5-1 tally over the Providence Friars. The hat trick was the first hat trick for a Northeastern player since Julia Marty in 2008. It was also the first five point game by a Husky since Chelsey Jones tallied five points against Maine on Dec. 3, 2006.
 Dec . 1: Northeastern Huskies freshman Rachel Llanes scored the first and last goal of the game in Northeastern’s 4-0 win over New Hampshire with six shots on goal. It was her first-ever multi-goal game. Another freshman, Katie MacSorley scored a goal in the 4-0 win over New Hampshire. Florence Schelling made 22 saves for her third shutout of the season. With the win, Northeastern snapped a 27-game unbeaten streak (0-26-1) against New Hampshire. Their last win over New Hampshire was Jan. 21, 2001, a 2-1 win. In addition, the fact that it was a shutout victory marks the first over UNH in the history of the program.
 On January 16, the Boston University Terriers defeated Maine and set a program record with their 11th home win of the season. The previous mark was 10 wins during the 2006-07 season.
 On January 22, 2011, Marie-Philip Poulin recorded a hat trick, including two power play goals as BU prevailed over Vermont in a 4-0 win. The win was the Terriers 100th win in program history. Poulin broke BU’s single-season points record with her second goal of the game and later tied the single-season goals record with her third marker.

Player stats

Scoring leaders
 (Through March 10)

Goaltending Leaders
 (through November 1)

Goals Against Average

Save Percentage

Saves

In season honors

Pure Hockey Player of the week
Throughout the conference regular season, Hockey East offices names a Pure Hockey player of the week each Monday.

Defensive Players of the week

Pro Ambitions Rookie of the week
Throughout the conference regular season, Hockey East offices names a rookie of the week each Monday.

Team of the week
Throughout the conference regular season, Hockey East offices names a team of the week each Monday.

Monthly Awards

Player of the Month

Defensive Player of the Month

Rookie of the Month

Three Stars standings
At the conclusion of each Hockey East league game, the Hockey East “Three
Stars of The Game” are selected. Here are the leaders for the 2010-2011
season to date.

Postseason
 February 17: Hockey East Commissioner Joe Bertagna announced that top seed Boston University and Walter Brown Arena will play host for the 2011 WHEA Championships. The championships will be held on March 5 and 6. The Championship Game will be shown tape delayed on the New England Sports Network (NESN) at 4pm on Sunday, March 6. Boston University and Boston College will be the No. 1 and No. 2 seeds for the semifinal round with first round byes in the tournament.
 On March 5, 2011, Florence Schelling set a Hockey East tournament record with 44 saves, including a record 24 in the first period as the Huskies upset No. 1 seed Boston University by a 4-2 tally at Walter Brown Arena. Alyssa Wohlfeiler tallied two goals and Claire Santostefano potted the game-winning goal
 Kelli Stack scored the game-winning goal in overtime as Boston College defeated Providence by a 3-2 tally to advance to the Hockey East championship game. Providence goalie Genevieve Lacasse would break the record set by Florence Schelling earlier in the day for most saves in a tournament game with 58.
 On March 18, 2011, Jillian Kirchner and junior Jenelle Kohanchuk scored in a 50-second span, as the Terriers advanced to the final of the 2011 NCAA Women's Division I Ice hockey Tournament. Kirchner's goal was the game winner as the Terriers improved to 27-6-4 and became the first Hockey East school to advance to the national title game. In addition, Catherine Ward was the first ever Terrier to be named an All-American, as she was selected for the second team.

Hockey East awards and honors
 Cammi Granato Award (Hockey East Player of the Year): Kelli Stack, Boston College
 Coach of the Year: Bob Deraney, Providence
 Rookie of the Year: Marie-Philip Poulin, Boston University
 Army ROTC Three Stars Award: Kelli Stack, Boston College
 Best Defenseman Award: Catherine Ward, Boston University
 Best Defensive Forward: Holly Lorms, Boston University
 Goaltending Champion: Kerrin Sperry, Boston University
 Scoring Champion: Kelli Stack, Boston College
 Sportsmanship Award: Jean O'Neill, Providence
 Turfer Athletic Award: Northeastern University

WHEA First-Team All-Stars
 G: Molly Schaus, Boston College
 D: Courtney Birchard, New Hampshire
 D: Catherine Ward, Boston University
 F: Marie-Philip Poulin, Boston University
 F: Kelli Stack, Boston College
 F: Jenn Wakefield, Boston University

2011 WHEA Second-Team All-Stars
 G: Alexandra Garcia, Connecticut
 D: Sami Evelyn, Connecticut
 D: Amber Yung, Providence
 F: Kate Bacon, Providence
 F: Jillian Kirchner, Boston University
 F: Mary Restuccia, Boston College

2011 WHEA Honorable Mention All-Stars
 G: Genevieve Lacasse, Providence
 G: Kerrin Sperry, Boston University
 D: Jennifer Friedman, Providence
 D: Meagan Mangene, Boston College
 D: Tara Watchorn, Boston University
 F: Jennie Gallo, Maine
 F: Rachel Llanes, Northeastern
 F: Danielle Welch, Boston College

All-Rookie team
 G: Kerrin Sperry, Boston University
 G: Roxanne Douville, Vermont
 D: Meagan Mangene, Boston College
 D: Rebecca Morse, Providence
 F: Corinne Buie, Providence
 F: Katie MacSorley, Northeastern
 F: Marie-Philip Poulin, Boston University (unanimous selection)

All-Americans

First Team
 G: Molly Schaus, Boston College

Second Team
 Kelli Stack, Boston College
 Catherine Ward, Boston University

2011 Hockey East Women's Ice Hockey Tournament

2011 Hockey East All-Tournament team

See also
 National Collegiate Women's Ice Hockey Championship
 2010–11 CHA women's ice hockey season
 2010–11 WCHA women's ice hockey season
 2010–11 ECAC women's ice hockey season

References

Hockey East
Hockey East